Monkjack is the eleventh studio album by Scottish musician Jack Bruce, released on 10 October 1995 by CMP Records. The album is unique in his catalogue in that he only sings and plays piano, and is joined only by former P-Funk organist Bernie Worrell. It features a re-working of the song "Weird of Hermiston" from his 1969 debut solo album Songs for a Tailor.

Track listing 
All tracks composed by Jack Bruce and Pete Brown; except where indicated

Personnel
Jack Bruce - voice, piano
Bernie Worrell - Hammond B3 organ

References

Jack Bruce albums
1995 albums